Olearia stuartii is a species of flowering plant in the family Asteraceae and is endemic arid parts of inland Australia. It is compact, spreading shrub or undershrub with lance-shaped leaves and blue to mauve and yellow, daisy-like inflorescences.

Description

Taxonomy
This daisy was first formally described in 1859 by Ferdinand von Mueller who gave it the name Eurybia stuartii in Fragmenta Phytographiae Australiae from specimens collected in western inland South Australia by John McDouall Stuart. In 1867 George Bentham changed the name to Olearia stuartii in Flora Australiensis. The specific epithet (stuartii) honours the collector of the type specimens.

Distribution and habitat
Olearia stuartii grows in woodland on rocky hills, on ranges, near cliffs and rocky creek beds in inland Western Australia, the south of the Northern Territory, the north-west of South Australia and inland Queensland.

References

stuartii
Asterales of Australia
Flora of the Northern Territory
Flora of South Australia
Flora of Western Australia
Flora of Queensland
Taxa named by Ferdinand von Mueller
Plants described in 1859